This is a list of amusement parks, water parks, and major festival parks in Wisconsin.

References

 
Amusement parks
Amusement parks